Allophylaria is a genus of fungi in the family Helotiaceae. , the nomenclatural database Index Fungorum lists 14 species in the genus.

Species

References

Helotiaceae
Taxa named by Petter Adolf Karsten
Leotiomycetes genera